Broughton (originally New Broughton) is situated on the south western coast of Westmoreland, Jamaica. Broughton is home to roughly 500 people. Most are fishermen, shop owners, and subsistence farmers, or work in nearby Negril and Savanna-la-Mar.

Populated places in Westmoreland Parish